The following is a list of articles listing military aircraft by nation.

Military aircraft by nation

See also
 List of air forces

Aircraft